Gounderpalayam, is a suburb located North of Chennai, a metropolitan city in Tamil Nadu, India.

Location
Gounderpalayam is located in between Manali New Town and Minjur in North of Chennai. The arterial road in Gounderpalayam is Tiruvottiyur Ponneri Panchetty High Road.

References

External links
CMDA Official Webpage

Neighbourhoods in Chennai